Orthographic may refer to:

 anything related to Orthography, a linguistic discipline that studies and regulates writing systems of particular languages.
 Orthographic reform
 Orthographic transcription
 Orthographic variant
 Orthographic depth
 Orthographic Latinisation
 Orthographic projection
 Orthographic projection (geometry)
 Orthographic projection (cartography)

See also
 Ortho (disambiguation)
 -graphy